Articles related to anatomy include:

A 

abdomen
abdominal aorta
abducens nerve
abducens nucleus
abducent
abducent nerve
abduction
accessory bone
accessory cuneate nucleus
accessory nerve
accessory olivary nucleus
accommodation reflex
acetabulum
Achilles tendon
acoustic nerve
acromion
adenohypophysis
adenoids
adipose
aditus
aditus ad antrum
adrenal gland
adrenergic
afferent neuron
agger nasi
agnosia
agonist
alar ligament
albuginea
alimentary
allantois
allocortex
alpha motor neurons
alveolar artery
alveolar process
alveolus
alveus of the hippocampus
amatory anatomy
amaurosis
Ammon's horn
ampulla
Ampulla of Vater
amygdala
amygdalofugal pathway
amygdaloid
amylacea
anaesthesia
analgesia
analogous
anastomosis
anatomical pathology
anatomical position
anatomical snuffbox
anatomical terms of location
anatomical terms of motion
anatomy
Anatomy of the human heart
anconeus
angiography
angiology
angular gyrus
anhidrosis
animal morphology
anisocoria
ankle
ankle reflex
annular ligament
annulus of Zinn
anomaly
anomic aphasia
anosognosia
ansa cervicalis
ansa lenticularis
anterior cerebral artery
Anterior chamber of eyeball
anterior choroidal artery
anterior commissure
anterior communicating artery
anterior corticospinal tract
anterior cranial fossa
anterior cruciate ligament
anterior ethmoidal foramen
anterior ethmoidal nerve
anterior funiculus
anterior horn cells
anterior horn of the lateral ventricle
anterior hypothalamus
anterior inferior cerebellar artery
anterior limb of the internal capsule
anterior lobe of cerebellum
anterior nucleus of the thalamus
anterior perforated substance
anterior pituitary
anterior root
anterior spinal artery
anterior spinocerebellar tract
anterior superior alveolar artery
anterior tibial artery
anterior vertebral muscle
anterior white commissure
anterolateral region of the neck
anterolateral system
antidromic
antihelix
antrum
anulus fibrosus
anulus tendineus
anus
aorta
aortic body
aponeurosis
apophysis
appendage
appendicular skeleton
appendix
aprosody
aqueductal stenosis
aqueous humor
arachnoid
arachnoid granulation
arbor vitae
archicerebellum
archicortex
archipallium
archistriatum
arcuate line
arcuate nucleus
area postrema
areola
arm
arrectores pilorum
arteria dorsalis pedis
arterial arcades
artery
articular condyle of mandible
articular disc
articulation
aryepiglotticus muscle
arytenoid
arytenoid cartilage
arytenoideus muscle
astereognosis
asterion
asterixis
astrocyte
asynergy
ataxia
atlanto-occipital joint
atlas
atresia
atrioventricular node
atrium
auditory aphasia
auditory cortex
auditory meatus
auditory ossicles
auditory radiations
auditory system
auditory tube
auricle
auriculotemporal nerve
auscultation
autonomic
autonomic ganglion
axial skeleton
axial view
axilla
axillary artery
axis
axon
axon collateral
axon hillock
azygos

B 

Babinski sign
baculum
ball and socket joint
band of Baillarger
Bartholin's gland
basal cistern
basal forebrain
basal ganglia
basalis nucleus of Meynert
basal lamina
basement membrane
basilar artery
basilar membrane
basis pedunculi
basket cell
basolateral amygdala
biceps
bicipital aponeurosis
bicuspid valve
bifurcation
bilateral symmetry
bile duct
biology
bipolar cells of the retina
bitemporal heminopia
blastomere
blood
blood brain barrier
body
bone
bone marrow
bony labyrinth
Bowman's capsule
brachial artery
brachial plexus
brachiocephalic vein
brachioradialis reflex
brachium conjunctivum
brachium of the inferior colliculus
brachium of the superior colliculus
brachium pontis
brachium restiformis
brain
brain stem
brainstem
branchia
branchiomeric musculature
breast
bregma
bridging veins
broad ligament of the uterus
Broca's area
bronchi
bronchiole
bronchus
Broner
Brunner's gland
buccal fatpad
buccal membrane
buccal nerve
buccinator
bulbospongiosus
bulbourethral gland
bulbus
bulla
bundle of His
bursa
buttock

C 

cafe-au-lait spots
calamus scriptorius
calcaneus
calcar
calcar avis
calcar femorale
calcarine cortex
calcarine fissure
calcarine sulcus
calf
calix
calvaria
calyx
canal of Schlemm
canaliculus
cancellous
canine tooth
canthus
capillary
capitate
capitulum
caput
caput medusae
carapace
cardiac
Cardiac skeleton
cardiophrenic angle
cardiovascular system
carina
carotid
carotid bifurcation
carotid body
carotid canal
carotid groove
carotid plexus
carotid sheath
carotid sinus
carotid siphon
carpus
cartilage
caruncle
catheter
cauda
cauda equina
caudal
caudate
caudate nucleus
cava
cavernous sinus
cavum tympani
cavum subdurale
cecum
celiac
celiac artery
celiac ganglion
celiac trunk
celom
central canal
Central gelatinous substance of spinal cord
central nucleus of inferior colliculus
central retinal artery
central sulcus
central tegmental tract
centromedian nucleus
centrum semi
centrum semiovale
cephalic
cephalic vein
cerebellar peduncle
cerebellar projection
cerebellar tonsil
cerebellopontine angle
cerebellorubral tract
cerebellothalamic tract
cerebellum
cerebral aqueduct
cerebral arterial circle
cerebral hemisphere
cerebral peduncle
cerebrospinal fluid
cerebrum
cerumen
cervical
cervical enlargement
cervical fascia
cervical plexus
cervical spinal nerves
cervical spine
cervical sympathetic ganglia
cervical vertebrae
cervicothoracic ganglion
cervix
chaetae
cheek
chest
Cheyne-Stokes respiration
chiasma
chiasmatic sulcus
choanae
chorda tympani
Chorionic villi
choroid
choroid plexus
chyle
ciliary arteries
ciliary body
ciliary ganglion
ciliary muscle
ciliary nerves
ciliospinal reflex
cilium
cingulate gyrus
cingulum
circle of Willis
circulatory system
circumflex artery
cisterna
cisterna chyli
cisterna magna
Clarke's column (dorsal nucleus)
claustrum
clava
clavicle
climbing fiber
clinoid
clitoris
clivus
cloaca
clonus
coccyx
cochlea
cochlear duct
cochlear nerve
coeliac
coelom
coeruleus
collar bone
collateral eminence
collateral fissure
collateral trigone
colliculus
collum
colon
columns of the fornix
commissure
common carotid artery
common facial vein
communicating veins
comparative anatomy
conchae
condylar process of mandible
condyle
cone cell
confluence of the sinuses
conjoint tendon
conjugate eye movement
conjunctiva
connective tissue
conoid
consensual reflex
constrictor
contralateral
conus elasticus
conus medullaris
Coracobrachialis muscle coracoid
coracoid process
cordotomy
cornea
corneal reflex
corniculate
cornu
corona
corona radiata
coronal plane
coronal suture
coronal view
coronary
coronary arteries
coronary sinus
coronoid
coronoid process
corpora quadrigemina
corpus albicans
corpus callosum
corpus striatum
corpuscle
corrugator
cortex
corticobulbar axons
corticomedial amygdala
corticopontine fibers
corticospinal tract
corticostriate fiber
costal cartilages
costal margin
costophrenic angle
Cowper's gland
coxae
cranial
cranial autonomic ganglia
cranial bone
cranial nerve ganglia
cranial nerve lesion
cranial nerve nuclei
cranial nerves
cranium
cremaster
cribriform
cribriform plate
cricoarytenoid ligament
cricoarytenoid muscle
cricoid
cricoid cartilage
cricothyroid joint
cricothyroid ligament
cricothyroid muscle
crista
crista galli
crossed extensor reflex
cruciform ligament
crus of cerebrum
crus of clitoris
crus of diaphragm
crus of fornix
crus of heart
crus of penis
crura of superficial inguinal ring
cubital
cuboid
culmen
cuneate
cuneate fasciculus
cuneate nucleus
cuneate tubercle
cuneiforms
cuneocerebellar fibers
cuneus
cupula
cusp
cutaneous
cyst
cystic duct
cystogram

D 

dartos
DCML
decerebrate response
declive
decomposition of movement
decorticate response
deep cerebellar nuclei
deep lingual artery
deglutition
deltoid
deltopectoral triangle
demyelination
dendrite
dendritic spine
dens
dental alveolus
dental caries
dental formula
dental pulp
dentate gyrus
dentate nucleus
dentatothalamic tract
denticulate ligament
dentine
dentition
depressor anguli oris muscle
dermatoglyphics
dermatome
dermis
descendens cervicalis
descending aorta
descending duodenum
detrusor
deviated septum
diagonal band
diagonal band of Broca
diaphragm
diaphragma sellae
diaphragmatic recess
diaphysis
diastole
diencephalon
digastric fossa
digastric muscle
digastric triangle
digestive system
diplopia
diploë
dislocation
dissection
distal
diverticulum
doll's eyes phenomenon
dorsal
dorsal cochlear nucleus
dorsal column
dorsal column nuclei
dorsal funiculus
dorsal horn
dorsal root
dorsal root ganglion
dorsal spinocerebellar tract
dorsal trigeminothalamic tract
dorsolateral fasciculus
dorsomedial nucleus of thalamus
dorsum sellae
dowager's hump
ductless gland
ductus
ductus deferens
duodenum
dura mater
dural septae
dural venous sinus

E 

ear
eardrum
ectopia (medicine)
Edinger-Westphal nucleus
efferent ducts
efferent nerve fiber
efferent limb
ejaculatory duct
elbow
electrical conduction system of the heart
emboliform nucleus
embolus
embryo
embryonic yolk stalk
emissary veins
enamel
encephalon
encephalopathy
endocardium
endocranium
endocrine gland
endocrine system
endoderm
endolymph
endometrium
endoneurium
endorphin
endothelium
enkephalin
entorhinal cortex
ependyma
epicanthus
epicardium
epicondyle
epicranial aponeurosis
epidermis
epididymis
epidural hematoma
epidural space
epigastrium
epiglottic cartilage
epiglottis
epimysium
epineurium
epiphyseal growth plates
epiphysis
epiploic foramen
epithalamus
epithelium
epitympanic recess
erector spinae
esophageal plexus
esophageal sphincter
esophagus
essential tremor
ethmoid bone
ethmoid sinus
ethmoidal air cells
ethmoidal bulla
Europhiles
eustachian tube
excretory system
exocrine gland
exophthalmos
exoskeleton
exotropia
extensor plantar response
extensor posturing
extensor retinaculum
external auditory meatus
external capsule
external carotid artery
external ear
external iliac artery
external jugular vein
external laryngeal nerve
external medullary lamina
external nasal nerve
external occipital protuberance
external ophthalmoplegia
extraocular muscles
extraperitoneal
extrapyramidal motor system
extrapyramidal signs
extrapyramidal system
extreme capsule
extrinsic muscle
eye
eyebrow
eyelash
eyelid

F 

fabella
face
facet joint
facial artery
facial bone
facial colliculus
facial nerve
facial nucleus
facial vein
falciform ligament
Fallopian tube
false vocal cord
falx cerebri
fascia
fascia lata
fasciculation
fasciculus lenticularis
fastigial nucleus
fastigium
fat
fauces
femoral artery
femoral neck
femoral triangle
femur
fenestra
fenestra cochleae
fenestra ovalis
fenestra vestibuli
fetus
fibre
fibril
fibrillation
fibrous coat of the eye
fibrous pericardium
fibrous skeleton of the heart
fibula
fields of Forel
filiform papillae
filum
filum terminale
fimbriae
finger
fingernail
first thoracic ganglion
fissure
fistula
flaccid paralysis
flaccidity
flank
flexion
flexor retinaculum
floating ribs
flocculonodular lobe
flocculus
fluent aphasia
foetus
fontanelle
foot
foramen
foramen lacerum
foramen magnum
foramen of Luschka
foramen of Magendie
foramen of Monro
foramen ovale (heart)
foramen ovale (skull)
foramen rotundum
foramen spinosum
forceps major
forearm
forebrain
forehead
foreskin
formication
fornix
fossa
Fourth trochanter
fourth ventricle
fovea
foveola
frenulum
frenulum linguae
frenum
frontal air sinus
frontal bone
frontal eye field
frontalis
frontal horn of lateral ventricle
frontal lobe
frontal nerve
frontal plane
frontal pole
frontal sinus
frontonasal duct
fundiform ligament
fundus
fungiform papillae
funiculus
furcula
fusiform gyrus

G 

gag reflex
galea aponeurotica
gall bladder
gamma motoneurons
ganglion
ganglion cell
ganglion cell of the retina
gasserian ganglion
gastrocnemius
gastroduodenal artery
gastroesophageal junction
gastrohepatic ligament
gastrointestinal tract
gemellus
geniculate ganglion
geniculate nucleus
geniculocalcarine tract
geniculum
genioglossus muscle
geniohyoid muscle
genitalia
genu of corpus callosum
genu of the internal capsule
gill
gingiva
gizzard
glabella
gland
glandula
glans
glenohumeral joint
glenoid fossa
glia
globose nucleus
globus pallidus
glomerulus
glossoepiglottic fold
glossopharyngeal nerve
glottis
gluteus maximus
gluteus medius
gluteus minimus
goiter
Golgi apparatus
gonad
gracile fasciculus
gracile nucleus
gracile tubercle
Gracilis muscle
granular layer
gravid
gray matter
Gray's Anatomy
great cerebral vein
great toe
greater auricular nerve
greater horn of the hyoid
greater occipital nerve
greater omentum
greater palatine artery
greater palatine canal
greater palatine foramen
greater palatine nerve
greater petrosal nerve
greater superficial petrosal nerve
Greater trochanter
greater wing of sphenoid
groin
gubernaculum
gums
gustatory
gyrencephalic
gyrus

H 

habenula
habenular nuclei
haemorrhoid
hair
hair cells
hair follicle
hallux
hamate
hamstrings
hamulus of hamate
hand
hard palate
haustrum
Haversian system
head of rib
heart
heel
helicotrema
helix
hematoma
hemiazygos vein
hemiballismus
hemidiaphragm
hemiparesis
hemisphere
hemothorax
hepatic
hepatic artery
hepatic flexure
hepatic portal vein
hepatic veins
hepatoduodenal ligament
hepatopancreatic ampulla hepatopancreatic sphincter
hernia
herniated disk
hiatus
hiatus semilunaris
hilar vessels
Hilton's law
hilum
hindbrain
hip bone
hippocampal formation
hippocampal pyramidal cell
hippocampal sulcus
hippocampus
histology
history of anatomy
Hoffmann's reflex
homologous
hormone
horn
human anatomical parts named after people
human anatomy
human body
human skeleton
humerus
humours
hunchback
hyaline cartilage
hymen
hyoglossus muscle
hyoid bone
hypaxial muscles
hypogastric artery
hypogastric nerve
hypoglossal canal
hypoglossal nerve
hypoglossal nucleus
hypoglossal trigone
hypopharynx
hypophyseal artery
hypophyseal fossa
hypophyseal portal system
hypophysis
hypophysis cerebri
hypothalamic sulcus
hypothalamohypophyseal portal system
hypothalamohypophyseal tract
hypothalamoreticular tract
hypothalamospinal tract
hypothalamotegmental tract
hypothalamus
hypothalmotegmental axon
hypothenar muscles

I 

ileal vessels
ileocecal valve
ileocolic artery
ileum
iliac crest
iliac lymph nodes
iliac region
iliac spine
iliacus muscle
iliolumbar artery
iliopsoas muscle
iliotibial band
ilium
immune system
impar ligament
incisive canal
incisive fossa
incisor
incisura
incus
index finger
indusium griseum
infarction
inferior alveolar artery
inferior alveolar nerve
inferior cerebellar peduncle
inferior cervical sympathetic ganglion
inferior colliculus
inferior concha
inferior frontal gyrus
inferior gluteal artery
inferior horn
inferior meatus
inferior mesenteric artery
inferior mesenteric vein
inferior nasal concha
inferior oblique muscle
inferior olivary nucleus
inferior orbital fissure
inferior petrosal sinus
inferior pharyngeal constrictor muscle
inferior pubic ramus
inferior rectus muscle
inferior sagittal sinus
inferior salivatory nucleus
inferior temporal gyrus
inferior thyroid artery
inferior thyroid vein
Inferior tibiofibular joint
inferior vena cava
inferior vestibular nucleus
infraglottic cavity
infrahyoid strap muscles
infraorbital canal
infraorbital foramen
infraorbital groove
infraorbital nerve
infraspinatus muscle
infratemporal fossa
infratentorial
infundibular nucleus
infundibulum
inguinal
inguinal canal
inguinal ligament
inguinal lymph nodes
inguinal rings
inguinal triangle
inion
inner table of skull
innervate
innominate
insula
integument
integumentary system
interatrial septum
intercalated disc
intercondylar eminences
intercostal muscles
interdigitation
interhemispheric fissure
intermediate horn cell
intermediolateral cell column
intermediolateral nucleus
internal acoustic meatus
internal arcuate fiber
internal capsule
internal carotid artery
internal cerebral vein
internal ear
internal iliac artery
internal iliac vein
internal jugular vein
internal laryngeal nerve
internal medullary lamina
internal oblique muscle
internal thoracic artery
internal thoracic veins
interneuron
internuncial
interosseus membrane
interpeduncular cistern
interpeduncular fossa
interstitial
interthalamic adhesion
intertrochanteric line
interventricular foramen of Monro
interventricular septum
intervertebral disc
Intestinal villus
intestine
intrafusal
intrafusal muscle fibers
intralaminar thalamic nuclei
intramedullary
intrathalamic adhesion
intravenous
intrinsic muscles of the tongue
introitus
ipsilateral
iris
iris dilator muscle
iris sphincter muscle
ischemia
ischial spine
ischial tuberosity
ischiorectal fossa
ischium
Islets of Langerhans
isthmus

J 

Jacksonian seizure
jaw
jejunum
joint
joint capsule
joint space
jugular
jugular foramen
jugular notch
jugum
juxtaglomerular apparatus

K 

keel
keloid
keratin
kidney
kinesthesia
kinocilium
knee
knee jerk reflex
kneecap
knuckle
koniocortex
kyphosis

L 

labia majora
labia minora
labium
labrum
labyrinth
lacrimal bone
lacrimal canaliculus
lacrimal fossa
lacrimal gland
lacrimal nerve
lacrimal papilla
lacrimal punctum
lacrimal sac
lactation
lacteal
lactiferous duct
lacuna
lacunae laterales
lacus lacrimalis
lambdoid suture
lamella
lamina
lamina papyracea
lamina terminalis
laminectomy
language center
lanugo
large intestine
laryngeal inlet
laryngopharynx
larynx
lateral aperture
lateral cervical muscle
lateral corticospinal tract
lateral cricoarytenoid muscle
lateral cuneate nucleus
lateral dorsal nucleus of thalamus
lateral fissure
lateral funiculus
lateral geniculate body or nucleus
lateral horn
lateral hypothalamus
lateral lemniscus
lateral olfactory stria
lateral posterior nucleus
lateral pterygoid muscle
lateral pterygoid plate
lateral recess (of the fourth ventricle)
lateral rectus muscle
lateral sclerosis
lateral semicircular canal
lateral spinothalamic tract
lateral striate arteries
lateral thalamic nucleus
lateral ventricles
lateral vertebral muscle
lateral vestibular nucleus
lateral vestibulospinal tract
latissimus dorsi
Laurer's canal
left atrium
left colic artery
left common carotid artery
left gastroepiploic artery
left mainstem bronchi
left marginal artery
left pulmonary artery
left ventricle
leg
lemniscus
lens
lenticular nucleus
lenticulostriate artery
lentiform
lentiform nucleus
leptomeninx
lesser occipital nerve
lesser omentum
lesser palatine foramen
lesser petrosal nerve
Lesser trochanter
lesser wing of sphenoid
levator muscle
levator labii superioris muscle
levator palpebrae muscle
levator palpebrae superioris
levator scapulae muscle
levator velum palatini muscle
ligament
ligament of Treitz
ligamentum arteriosum
ligamentum flavum
ligamentum teres
light reflex
limbic system
limen insulae
line of Gennari
linea alba
linea aspera
lingua
lingual artery
lingual nerve
lingual tonsil
lingual vein
lingula
lip
lipofuscin
Lissauer's tract
lissencephalic
list of human anatomical features
Little's area
liver
lobule
locus coeruleus
loin
long bone
long ciliary nerves
longitudinal fissure
longus capitis muscle
longus colli muscle
love handles
lower motor neuron
lumbar
lumbar artery
lumbar enlargement
lumbar spine
lumbar vertebrae
lumbosacral enlargement
lumbosacral plexus
lumbrical
lunate
lung
lymph
lymph nodes
lymphatic system
lymphatic vessels

M 

macroscopic
macula
macular sparing
magnocellular nuclei
main pulmonary artery
major duodenal papilla
malleolus
malleus
Malpighian layer
mammae
mammary gland
mammilla
mammillary bodies
mammillothalamic tract
mammogram
mandible
mandibular condyles
mandibular foramen
mandibular fossa
mandibular nerve
mandibular notch
manubrium
massa intermedia
masseter muscle
masseteric vessels
mastication
mastoid air cells
mastoid process
matrix
maxilla
maxillae
maxillary antrum
maxillary artery
maxillary nerve
maxillary sinus
meconium
medial forebrain bundle
medial geniculate boby
medial geniculate nucleus or body
medial lemniscus
medial longitudinal fasciculus
medial meniscus
medial olfactory stria
medial pterygoid plate
medial rectus muscle
medial vestibular nucleus
medial vestibulospinal tract
median aperture
median eminence
median neuropathy
mediastinum
medulla oblongata
medullary cavity
medullary velum
Meissner's corpuscle
membrane
membraneous urethra
membranous labyrinth
mengingioma
meninges
meningiomas
meniscus (anatomy)
mental foramen
mental nerve
mentalis muscle
mentum
mesencephalic reticular formation
mesencephalic trigeminal nucleus and tract
mesencephalon
midbrain
mesenchyme
mesentery
mesoderm
mesosalpinx
metacarpus
metaphysis
metastatic lesion
metatarsals
metatarsus
metathalamus
metencephalon
metopic
Meyer's loop
microglia
micturition
midbrain
middle cerebellar peduncle
middle cerebral artery
middle cervical sympathetic ganglion
middle colic artery
middle concha
middle cranial fossa
middle ear
middle ear bone complex
middle meatus
middle meningeal artery
middle meningeal vein
middle pharyngeal constrictor muscle
middle sacral artery
middle superior alveolar artery
middle temporal gyrus
midline nuclei
miosis
mitral cell
modiolus
molar
monaminergic neurons
mononeuropathy multiplex
mons pubis
moro reflex
morphology
morula
mossy fiber ending
motor aphasia
motor cortex
motor endplate
motor neuron
motor unit
mouth
mucoperiosteum
mucosa
mucous membranes
multifidus
muscle
muscle fascicle
muscle spindle
muscle tissue
muscles of the thorax
muscular atrophy
muscular system
muscular triangle
mydriasis
myelencephalon
myelin
myelogram
myelomeningocele
myelopathy
mylohyoid
mylohyoid groove
mylohyoid line
mylohyoid muscle
mylohyoid nerve
myocardium
myocyte
myology
myotome
myotonia
myotonic dystrophy

N 

nape
naris
nasal bone
nasal choanae
nasal concha
nasal septum
nasal turbinates
nasion
nasociliary nerve
nasolacrimal canal
nasolacrimal duct
nasopalatine nerve
nasopharynx
natal
navicular
neck
neocerebellum
neocortex
neonatal
neopallium
neospinothalamic axon
neostriatum
nephron
nerve of the pterygoid canal
nerve
nerve fascicle
nervi erigentes
nervous system
neural crest cell
neural foramen
neural groove
neural tube defect
neural tube
neural
neuroectoderm
neuroglia
neurohypophysis
neurolemma
neurology
neuromuscular junction
neuron
neuropil
nevus
nictitating membrane
nigrostriatal axon
nipple
Nissl body
nociception
nodes of Ranvier
nodose ganglion
nodule
nodulus
norma frontalis
norma lateralis
nose
nostril
nares
notochord
nuchal ligament
nucleus
nucleus accumbens
nucleus ambiguus
nucleus fastigius
nucleus of Luys
nucleus pulposus
nucleus solitarius
nystagmus, pathologic
nystagmus, physiologic

O 

obex
oblique muscles
obturator canal
obturator externus muscle
obturator foramen
obturator internus muscle
occipital artery
occipital bone
occipital horn
occipital lobe
occipitalis muscle
occiput
occlusion
oculocephalic reflex
oculomotor
oculomotor complex
oculomotor nerve
oculomotor nucleus
oculus
odontoid process
oesophagus
olecranon process
olfaction
olfactory association cortex
olfactory bulb
olfactory cortex
olfactory epithelium
olfactory mucosa
olfactory nerve
olfactory striae
olfactory system
olfactory tract
olfactory trigone
oligodendroglia
oligodendroglial cells
olive
olivocerebellar axon
olivopontocerebellar degeneration
omental bursa
omentum
omohyoid
omohyoid fascia
omohyoid muscle
ontogeny
operculum
ophthalmology
ophthalmic artery
optic canal
optic chiasm
optic disc
optic foramen
optic nerve
optic papilla
optic radiation
optic recess
optic tract
ora serrata
oral cavity
orbicularis oculi muscle
orbicularis oris muscle
orbit
orbitofrontal cortex
organ
organ of Corti
organelle
orifice
oropharynx
os multangulum minus
os penis
ossicles
ossification
osteology
osteon
ostium
otic ganglion
otolith
outer table of skull
oval window
ovarian follicle
ovary
ovum

P 

pachymeninx
pacinian corpuscle
palate
palatine bone
palatine glands
palatine process
palatine tonsils
palatoglossal arch
palatoglossus muscle
palatopharyngeal arch
palatopharyngeus muscle
paleocerebellum
paleopallium
paleospinothalamic axon
paleostriatum
pallidothalamic fiber
palmar aponeurosis
palmomental reflex
palpation
palpebral commissures
pampiniform plexus
pancreas
pancreatic duct
pancreaticoduodenal branches
panniculus
papilla
papillary muscles
paraaortic lymph nodes
paracentral lobule
paracolic gutters
paradidymis
paraesthesia
parafascicular nucleus
parahippocampal gyrus
parailiac lymph nodes
parallel fibers
paralysis
paramedian pontine reticular formation
parametrium
paraphasia
pararenal
parasagittal
parasternal
parasympathetic
paraterminal gyrus
parathyroid glands
paraventricular nucleus
parenchyma
paresis
paresthesia
parietal bones
parietal cell
parietal lobe
parotid bed
parotid duct
parotid gland
parturition
parotid papilla
parotid sheath
pars flaccida
pars opercularis
pars tensa
parvicellular neurosecretory nuclei
patella
patellar reflex
pecten pubis
pectinate
pectineal
pectineus
pectoral
pectoral girdle
pectoralis
pectoralis major
pectoralis minor
pedicle
peduncle
pellucidum
pelvic diaphragm
pelvic floor
pelvic inlet
pelvic outlet
pelvis
penis
pennate
pennatus
periamygdaloid area
periamygdaloid cortex
perianal
periaqueductal gray
pericardium
perichondrium
pericranium
perikaryon
perilymph
perineum
perineurium
periodontal ligament
periosteum
peripheral
peripheral nervous system
perirhinal cortex
peristalsis
peritoneal cavity
peritoneum
periventricular nucleus
peroneal artery
Persistent truncus arteriosus
pes anserinus
pes hippocampi
petrosal ganglion
petrosal ridge
petrous bone
petrous pyramid
Peyer's patches
phalanges
phalanges of the foot
phalanges of the hand
phallus
pharyngeal constrictor muscles
pharyngeal plexus
pharyngeal recess
pharyngeal tonsil
pharyngobasilar fascia
pharyngotympanic tube
pharynx
philtrum
phonation
photoreceptors
phrenic nerve
phylogeny
pia mater
pilar cell
pillar of fauces
pilomotor
pilus
pineal body
pineal gland
pinna
piriformis
piriform sinus
pisiform
pituitary gland
placenta
plantar aponeurosis
platysma muscle
pleura
plexus
plica semilunaris
pollex
pollicis
pollux
pons
pontine nuclei
pontocerebellum
popliteal artery
popliteal bursa
popliteal fossa
popliteal vein
popliteus
portal vein
postcentral gyrus
posterior atlantooccipital membrane
posterior auricular artery
posterior cerebral artery
Posterior chamber of eyeball
posterior clinoid
posterior column-medial lemniscus tract
posterior commissure
posterior communicating artery
posterior cranial fossa
posterior cricoarytenoid muscle
posterior cruciate ligament
posterior ethmoidal foramina
posterior funiculus
posterior hypothalamus
posterior inferior cerebellar artery
posterior lobe of the cerebellum
posterior nasal artery
posterior septal artery
posterior spinal arteries
posterior spinocerebellar tract
posterior superior alveolar artery
posterior tibial artery
posterior triangle of the neck
posterolateral fissure
Postganglionic neuron
posture
precentral gyrus
precuneus
prefrontal cortex
preganglionic
preganglionic neurons
preganglionic parasympathetic neurons
preganglionic sympathetic neurons
premolar
premotor cortex
preoccipital notch
preoptic recess
preoptic region
prepuce
prepyriform cortex
presacral space
prevertebral fascia
primary fissure
primary olfactory cortex
primary sensory neuron
primary somatosensory cortex
proboscis
procerus
process
processus
profunda femoris artery
profundus
projection fibers
prominens
promontory
pronate
prone
proprioception
proprioceptive
proprius
prosection
prosector
prosencephalon
forebrain
prosopagnosia
prostate
prostatic urethra
protract
protrude
protuberance
proximal
psoas muscle
pterion
pterygoid plate
pterygoid process
pterygomandibular ligament
pterygopalatine foramen
pterygopalatine fossa
pterygopalatine ganglion
ptosis
puberty
pubic hair
pubic symphysis
pubis
pudendal nerve
pulmonary
pulmonary alveolus
pulmonary trunk
pulmonary vein
pulp
pulvinar
punctum
pupil
pupillary dilatation
pupillary light reflex
purkinje cells
putamen
pyloric antrum
pyloric valve
pylorus
pyramid
pyramidal cell
pyramidal system
pyramidal tract
pyriform cortex
pyriform lobe

Q 

quadrangular membrane
quadrangular space
quadrate
quadratojugal
quadriceps
quadrigeminal body
quadrigeminal plate
quadrigeminal plate cistern
quadrigeminus
quadriplegia

R 

radial artery
radius
radula
rami communicantes
ramus
raphe
raphe nuclei
receptor layer of retina
rectum
rectus abdominis muscle
rectus capitis anterior muscle
rectus capitis lateralis muscle
rectus femoris muscle
rectus sheath
recurrent laryngeal nerve
red nucleus
reflex
Reissner's membrane
Reissner's fibre
renal artery
renal calices
renal capsule
renal cortex
renal hilus
renal pyramids
renal system
reproductive system
respiratory system
restiform body
rete
rete testis
reticular formation
reticular nucleus of thalamus
reticulospinal tract
reticulum (anatomy)
retina
retinaculum
retinal artery
retinotopic
retrobulbar neuritis
retrogastric area
retromandibular vein
Retromolar space
retroperitoneal
retropharyngeal space
retroversion
retrovisceral space
Rexed's laminae
rhinencephalon
rhombencephalon
rhomboid fossa
rib
right atrium
right colic artery
right common carotid artery
right gastroepiploic artery
right mainstem bronchi
right marginal artery
right pulmonary artery
right ventricle
rima glottidis
risorius
rod cells
rostrum of corpus callosum
rotator cuff
round ligament of the uterus
round window
rubrospinal tract
rugae

S 

saccade
saccule
sacral ala
sacral vertebrae
sacral promontory
sacroiliac joint
sacrum
sagittal crest
sagittal suture
saliva
salivary gland
salpinx
saphenous vein
sartorius
satellite cells
scala media
scala tympani
scala vestibuli
scalp
scaphoid
scaphoid fossa
scapula
scar
Schwann cell
sciatic nerve
sclera
scleral venous sinus
sclerotome
scoliosis
scotoma
scrotum
scutum
sebaceous glands
secondary oocyte
secondary sensory neuron relay
secretion
sella turcica
semen
semicircular canal
semilunaris
semimembranosus
seminal vesicles
seminiferous tubules
semitendinosus
sensorimotor cortex
sensory decussation
sensory system
septal cartilage
septal nuclei
septal vein
septum
septum pellucidum
septum primum
septum secundum
serous
serous membrane
serous pericardium
sesamoid bone
sex organ
Sharpey's fibres
short ciliary nerves
shoulder
shoulder blade
shin
sight
sigmoid colon
sigmoid sinus
Simian crease
simian shelf
sinoatrial node
sinus
skeletal system
skeleton
skin
skull
small intestine
smegma
soft palate
sole (foot)
soleus
solitary nucleus
solitary tract
somatic
somatic motor nuclei
somite
spasm
spasticity
specific sensory nucleus of thalamus
spermatheca
spermatic cord
sphenoethmoidal recess
sphenoid bone
sphenoidal sinus
sphenopalatine artery
sphenopalatine foramen
sphincter
sphincter of the bile duct
sphincter of the pancreatic duct
spicule (nematode)
spicule (sponge)
spina bifida
spinal accessory nucleus
spinal cord
spinal lemniscus
spinal nerve
spine
spine of the scapula
spinocerebellar tract
spinocerebellum
spinocervical pathway
spinothalamic tract
spinous process
spiral ganglion
splanchnic nerves
spleen
splenic artery
splenic flexure
splenic vein
splenium of the corpus callosum
splenius capitis muscle
squamous
stapedius
stapes
stellate cell
stellate ganglion
stereocilia
stereognosis
sternoclavicular articulation
sternocleidomastoid muscle
sternohyoid muscle
sternothyroid muscle
sternum
stoma
stomach
straight sinus
strap muscles
Stratum lucidum
stratum zonale
stretch reflex
striae gravidarum
stria medullaris thalami
stria terminalis
striate cortex
striate nucleus
striatum
stroma
stylet
styloglossus muscle
stylohyoid muscle
styloid process
stylopharyngeus muscle
subarachnoid cisternae
subarachnoid space
subcallosal gyrus
subclavian artery
subclavian vein
subdural hematoma
subdural space
subglottic airway
subiculum
sublingual fossa
sublingual region
sublingual salivary gland
subluxation
submandibular duct
submandibular ganglion
submandibular gland
submandibular triangle
submental triangle
suboccipital muscle
suboccipital triangle
subscapularis muscle
Substantia gelatinosa of Rolando
substantia innominata
substantia nigra
subthalamic nucleus
succus
sulcus
sulcus limitans
superciliary arch
superciliary line
superficial cervical muscle
superficial muscular aponeurotic system
superficial temporal artery
superior alveolar artery
superior cerebellar artery
superior cerebellar peduncle
superior cervical ganglion
superior colliculus
superior concha
superior gluteal artery
superior jugular bulb
superior laryngeal artery
superior laryngeal nerve
superior meatus
superior mesenteric artery
superior mesenteric vein
superior oblique muscle
superior olivary nucleus
superior ophthalmic vein
superior orbital fissure
superior petrosal sinus
superior pharyngeal constrictor muscle
superior pubic ramus
superior rectus
superior rectus muscle
superior sagittal sinus
superior salivatory nucleus
superior temporal gyrus
superior thyroid artery
superior thyroid vein
Superior tibiofibular joint
superior vena cava
superior vesicle artery
superior vestibular nucleus
supplementary motor cortex
supporting cell
suprachiasmatic cistern
supraclavicular nerves
supramarginal gyrus
supraoptic nucleus
supraorbital artery
supraorbital foramen
supraorbital nerve
suprapatellar bursa
sural nerve
suspensory ligament
sustentaculum tali
suture
sweat glands
sylvian fissure
sympathetic chain ganglion
sympathetic nerve
sympathetic nervous system
sympathetic trunk
symphysis
synapse
 synaptic bouton
syncytium
syndesmosis
synovial fluid
synovial joint
systole

T 

tabes dorsalis
taenia coli
tail of pancreas
talus
tapetum lucidum
tarsus
taste buds
taste pore
Tectorial membrane (cochlea)
Tectorial membrane of atlanto-axial joint
tectospinal tract
tectum
tegmen tympani
tegmentum
tela choroidae
telencephalon
temporal artery
temporal bone
temporal fascia
temporal gyrus
temporal lobe
temporal pole
temporalis muscle
temporomandibular joint
tendon
tensor tympani muscle
tensor veli palatini
tentorial incisure
tentorial notch
tentorium cerebelli
Terminal sulcus (heart)
Terminal sulcus of tongue
terminal vein
tertiary sensory neuron
testicle
testis
thalamic fasciculus
thalamogeniculate artery
thalamostriate fibers
thalamotomy
thalamus
thenar eminence
thigh
thigh bone
Third trochanter
third ventricle
thoracic aorta
thoracic cavity
thoracic duct
thoracic spine
thoracic vertebrae
thorax
thrombus
thymus
thyroarytenoid muscle
thyrocervical trunk
thyroepiglotticus muscle
thyroglossal duct
thyrohyoid membrane
thyrohyoid muscle
thyroid
thyroid cartilage
thyroid gland
tibia
tibial tuberosity
toe
tomogram
tongue
tonsil
tonsil of cerebellum
tooth
torcular herophili
torso
torticollis
torus
trabecula
trabecular meshwork
trachea
tract of Lissauer
tractus solitarius
tragus
transverse cervical artery
transverse cervical nerve
transverse colon
transverse facial artery
transverse pericardial sinus
transverse process
transverse sinus
transversus abdominis muscle
trapezium
trapezius
trapezoid
trapezoid body
triangle of auscultation
triangles of the neck
triceps
triceps reflex
tricuspid valve
trigeminal ganglion
trigeminal lemniscus
trigeminal nerve
Trigone of urinary bladder
triquetral
triticeal cartilage
Trochlea of humerus
Trochlea of superior oblique
trochlear nerve
trochlear nucleus
Trochlear process
true vocal cords
Truncus arteriosus (embryology)
tuber cinereum
tuberal nuclei
tuberal region of hypothalamus
tubercle
tubercle of rib
tuberculum impar
tuberoinfundibular tract
tuberosity
tunica vaginalis testis
turbinate
turbinate bone
tympanic cavity
tympanic membrane
tympanic plexus
tympanum

U 

ulna
ulnar artery
ulnar nerve
umbilical folds
umbilicus
umbo
uncal cortex
uncal herniation
Uncinate process of ethmoid bone
Uncinate process of pancreas
Uncinate process of vertebra
Uncinate processes of ribs
upper motor neuron
urachus
ureter
urethra
urinary bladder
urogenital system
uterine cavity
uterine tube
uterus
utricle
uvea
uvula

V 

vagina
vagus ganglia
vagus nerve
vallate papillae
vallecula
Valsalva maneuver
varicocele
varus deformity
vasa recta
vascular system
vein
velum
velum interpositum
vena terminalis
venogram
venter
ventral amygdalofugal pathway
ventral anterior thalamic nucleus
ventral cochlear nucleus
ventral corticospinal tract
ventral horn cell
ventral lateral nucleus of thalamus
ventral posterolateral nucleus
ventral posterolateral thalamus
ventral posteromedial nucleus
ventral root
ventral spinocerebellar tract
ventral trigeminothalamic tract
ventricle
ventromedial nucleus of hypothalamus
vermiform appendix
vertebra
vertebral artery
vertebral body
vertebral canal
vertebral column
vertebral vein
vertebrobasilar system
vertigo
vesicle
vesiculae seminales
vestibular folds
vestibular ganglion
vestibular membrane
vestibular nuclei
Vestibule of the ear
vestibulocerebellar fiber
vestibulocerebellum
vestibulocochlear nerve
vestibuloocular reflexes
vestibulospinal tract
vibrissae
vidian nerve
vinculum (ligament)
viscera
visceromotor nuclei
viscus
Visible Human Project
visual cortex
visual fields
visual radiation
vitreous body
vitreous humor
vocal folds
vocal ligaments
vocalis muscle
volvulus
vomer
vomeronasal organ
vomiting center
vorticosae
vulva

W 

Waldeyer's ring
Wernicke's area
Wharton's duct
Wharton's jelly
white matter
withdrawal reflex
wrist

X 

xiphoid process

Z 

zona incerta
zona pellucida
zootomy
zygapophysis
zygoma
Zygomatic arch
Zygomatic bone
Zygomatic branches of the facial nerve
Zygomaticus major muscle
Zygomaticus minor muscle
Zygomatic nerve
Zygomatic process
Zygomatic process of frontal bone
Zygomatic process of maxilla
Zygomatic process of temporal bone
zygote

 
Anatomy
Anatomical topics